Fran Clough is a retired England rugby union player who played as a centre four times for England in the period 1986-7, including the 1987 Rugby World Cup. He was born November 1, 1962, in Wigan. Clough initially studied at Durham University, where he made appearances for Durham University RFC and graduated with a degree in Applied Physics in 1984. He moved on to Cambridge – at the time it was commonplace for Cambridge to recruit Durham graduates to represent Cambridge University RFC.

Brian Moore once placed him in his all time touring 15.
During his career he played club rugby for Orrell R.U.F.C., Wasps RFC and Bedford Blues.

Fran Clough is the Surmaster at St Paul’s School, London.

References

1962 births
Living people
English rugby union players
England international rugby union players
Rugby union centres
Orrell R.U.F.C. players
Wasps RFC players
Bedford Blues players
Cambridge University R.U.F.C. players
Durham University RFC players
Alumni of Collingwood College, Durham
Rugby union players from Wigan